This is a list of legally married same-sex couples.

Female

Presently married

 Stephanie Allynne and Tig Notaro, American comedian (m. October 2015)
 Meredith Baxter, American actress and producer, and Nancy Locke (m. 2013)
 Lauren Blitzer and Chely Wright, American country music artist (m. August 2011)
 Bridgett Casteen and Dot-Marie Jones, American actress and athlete (m. December 2013)
 Tristin Chapman and Emily Saliers, member of the Indigo Girls (m. 2013)
 Amy Ray and Carrie Schrader (m. 2014)
 Monica Coleman, hotelier, and Kate Pierson, member of The B-52's (m. August 2015)
 Ellen DeGeneres, American comedian and television show host, and Portia de Rossi, Australian-American actress (m. 2008)
 Melissa Etheridge, American singer-songwriter, and Linda Wallem, American actress (m. May 2014)
 Jodie Foster, American actress and director, and Alexandra Hedison, American photographer and actress (m. April 2014)
 Sara Gilbert, American actress, and Linda Perry, American singer-songwriter (m. April 2014)
 Glennon Doyle, American author, and Abby Wambach, American retired soccer player (m. May 2017)
 Jónína Leósdóttir, novelist, and Jóhanna Sigurðardóttir, 24th Prime Minister of Iceland (m. 2010)
 Christine Marinoni and Cynthia Nixon, American actress (m. 2012)
Christine C. Quinn, former New York City Council Speaker and Kim Catullo, lawyer (m. 2012)
 Alex Sykes and Wanda Sykes, American comedian and actress (m. October 2008)
 Lily Tomlin, American actress, and Jane Wagner, American writer and producer (m. December 2013)
 Daniela Mercury, Brazilian singer-songwriter, and Malu Verçosa (m. 2013)
 Sharon Kleinbaum and Randi Weingarten (m. 2018)
 Belinda O'Hooley and Heidi Tidow (m. 2016)
 Niecy Nash and Jessica Betts (m. 2020)
 Raven-Symoné and Miranda Maday (m. 2020) 
 Paula Pell and Janine Brito (m. 2020)
 Cameron Esposito and Katy Nishimoto (m. 2021)
 Jane Lynch and Jennifer Cheyne (m. 2021)

Divorced

 Margaret Wenig and Sharon Kleinbaum (m. 2008, now divorced)
 Marianne Dupon and Yasmine, Belgian singer (m. 2003, d. 2009)
 Sarah Huffman and Abby Wambach, both American soccer players (m. 2013, d. 2016)
 Alison Balian and Saffron Burrows, English actress (m. 2013, d. 2020)
 Allison Mack, American actress, and Nicki Clyne, Canadian actress (m. 2017, d. 2020)
 Rhea Butcher and Cameron Esposito, American stand up comedians and creator-stars of Seeso's Take My Wife (m. 2015, d. 2018)
Rosie O'Donnell and (m. Kelli Carpenter 2004, voided by the state in 2004) and (m. Michelle Rounds 2012, d. 2015)
 Jane Lynch and Lara Embry (m. 2010, d. 2014)

Widowed

 Ruthie Berman and Connie Kurtz, American LGBT rights activists who were married in 2011 (Kurtz died in 2018)

Deceased
Del Martin and Phyllis Lyon, American feminist and gay-rights activists who were married in 2004 (but were voided by the state) and then remarried in June 2008 (Martin died two months later and Lyon died in 2020)
Kylen Schulte and Crystal Turner, American couple who were both married and both murdered in 2021

Male

Presently married

Michael McConnell and Jack Baker (m. 1971),  first same-sex couple to be married legally with a license that was never revoked
Michael Leshner and Michael Stark (m. 2003), the first married gay couple in Canada
Michael Hendricks and René Leboeuf (m. 2004), the first married gay couple in Quebec
 Jonathan Adler and Simon Doonan (m. September 2008)
 Brad Altman and George Takei, Japanese-American actor and activist, (m. 2008)
 John Barrowman and Scott Gill (m. March 2013)
 Scott Capurro, American actor is married to a man whose first name is Edson
 Danny Pintauro and Will Tabares, (m. April 2014)
 Lance Bass and Michael Turchin (m. December 2014)
 Nate Berkus and Jeremiah Brent (m. 2014)
 Xavier Bettel, Prime Minister of Luxembourg and Gauthier Destenay, Belgian architect (m. 15 May 2015)
 Matt Bomer and Simon Halls (m. 2011)
 Casey Breves and Sam Tsui (m. 2016)
 PJ and Thomas (m. 2015)
 David Burtka and Neil Patrick Harris (m. September 2014)
 Pete Buttigieg, American politician, and Chasten Buttigieg, American schoolteacher and writer (m. 2018)
 Mario Cantone and Jerry Dixon (m. 2011)
 Alan Cumming and Grant Shaffer (m. January 2012)
 Tom Daley and Dustin Lance Black (m. May 2017)
 Matt Dallas and Blue Hamilton (m. July 2015)
 Thomas Dekker and Jesse Haddock, actors (m. 2017)
 P. David Ebersole and Todd Hughes, filmmakers (m. 2008)
 Jesse Tyler Ferguson and Justin Mikita (m. 2013)
 Barney Frank, former member of the House of Representatives and chairman of the House Financial Services Committee, and James Ready (m. 2012)
 Stephen Fry and Elliott Spencer (m. January 2015)
 David Furnish and Elton John (m. December 2014)
 Mark Gatiss and Ian Hallard (m. 2008)
 Glenn Greenwald, American journalist and lawyer, and David Miranda, Brazilian politician (m. 2005)
 Dean Hamer, scientist, author and filmmaker and Joe Wilson, film director and producer (m. 2004)
 Sean Hayes and Scott Icenogle (m. November 2014)
 Axel Hirsoux, Belgian singer, is married to a man
 Cheyenne Jackson and Jason Landau (m. September 2014)
 Garry Kief and Barry Manilow (m. 2014)
 T. R. Knight and Patrick Leahy (m. October 2013)
 Michael Kors and Lance LePere (m. August 2011)
Sean Patrick Maloney, United States Member of the House of Representatives and Randy Florke (m.2014) 
 David Miller and Ryan Murphy (m. 2012)
 Steve Alden Nelson and Sab Shimono, Japanese-American actor (m. 2008)
 Jack Noseworthy, actor, and Sergio Trujillo, theater director and choreographer, (m. 2011)
 Jim Parsons, actor, and Todd Spiewak, producer (m. 2017)
 Dave Rubin, American political commentator, and David Janet (m. 2015)
 Toni Reis, Brazilian activist, and David Harrad (m. December 2018)
 Rob Halford, English heavy metal singer, and Thomas Pence (m. 2020)
 Marc Acito, American playwright, novelist, and humorist, and Floyd Sklaver (m. 20??)

Divorced

 Mark Andrew and Gene Robinson, bishop of the Episcopal Church (m. 2008–2014)

Widowed

 Brian Bedford, actor, and Tim MacDonald (m. 2013–2016, Bedford's death)
 Stan Cadwallader and Jim Nabors, actor and singer (m. 2013–2017, Nabors' death)
 Richard Buckley and Tom Ford (m. 2014–2021, Buckley's death)
Steven Sabados and Chris Hyndman (m. 2009–2015, Hyndman's death)

Deceased
Billie Ert and Antonio Molina, Americans who were married in 1972, (but later voided by the state of Texas) (Billie Ert died 1976), (Antonio Molina died 1991)
Axel and Eigil Axgil, Danish gay activists who were married in 1989 (Axel Axgil died 2011), (Eigil Axgil died 1995)
Otis Charles, bishop of the Episcopal Church, and Felipe Sanchez-Paris (m. 2008–2013, Sanchez-Paris' death in 2013 and Charles' death later in 2013)

Notes

References

Same-sex married couples
Lists of LGBT-related people

Same-sex marriage